Honeymoon is a 1972 Swedish drama film directed by Claes Lundberg. It was entered into the 22nd Berlin International Film Festival.

Cast
 Lena-Pia Bernhardsson as Eva
 Carl Billquist as Salesman
 Christer Enderlein as Carl
 Lena Lindgren as Inger
 Tord Peterson as Manager of Konsum
 Meta Velander as Mrs. Erikson
 Marvin Yxner as Tarzan

References

External links

1972 films
1970s Swedish-language films
1972 drama films
Swedish black-and-white films
Swedish drama films
1970s Swedish films